Maria is a national park located in New South Wales, Australia,  northeast of Sydney.  Part of  the Hastings-Macleay Important Bird Area lies within its boundaries. The park is located at an altitude of 33.48 meters.

See also
 Protected areas of New South Wales

References

National parks of New South Wales
Protected areas established in 1999
1999 establishments in Australia
Mid North Coast